Elizabeth Ann Britton Harding Blaesing (October 22, 1919 – November 17, 2005) was the daughter of Warren G. Harding, the 29th president of the United States, and his mistress, Nan Britton. Harding and Britton, who both lived in Marion, Ohio, began their affair when he was a U.S. senator and it continued until his sudden death during his presidency in 1923.

Biography

Nan Britton, who made her claim public with the publication of her book, The President's Daughter (Elizabeth Ann Guild, 1927), could never produce primary source evidence to prove that Harding acknowledged his paternity of the child. Elizabeth Ann used Harding's surname as a child and young adult; her birth certificate, however, due to a doctor's error, was written in the name of Emma Eloise Britton. Her mother also used Christian as her child's surname at one point.

Elizabeth Ann, after her birth in Asbury Park, New Jersey, was given to her aunt and uncle, Elizabeth and Scott Willits of Athens, Ohio, to be raised. The Willitses were both music professors at Ohio University.  The young girl lived in Athens for several years until she was taken back by Britton once Britton's book was published.  Elizabeth Ann graduated from Sullivan High School in the Rogers Park neighborhood of Chicago, Illinois; later she married Henry Edward Blaesing on September 18, 1938, in Chicago. At the time Nan Britton began a series of newspaper interviews discussing "Ann Harding" and her marriage, but refusing to provide the name of her husband.

In the late 1950s and early 1960s, Ann, her husband, and her sons lived on Alderdale Street in Downey, California. In the mid-1960s the family moved to Glendale, California. In 1964, the matter of Harding's alleged paternity of Elizabeth Ann was again brought to the forefront when a series of lawsuits in Ohio involving the ownership of love letters written by Harding to his late mistress Carrie Phillips were taking place. In an Associated Press wire service article distributed in mid-July of that year, Elizabeth Ann Blaesing confirmed publicly that in 1934 her mother had told her that Warren G. Harding was her biological father. "It's not something that you bring up in casual conversation," she stated in the story.

When contacted by Harding scholar Robert H. Ferrell, author of The Strange Deaths of President Harding and later by John Dean, author of  Warren Harding, The American President Series, Blaesing refused interviews on the topic.

Blaesing died in Oregon on November 17, 2005. The family did not make a public announcement about the death; however, her son Thomas Blaesing did confirm the event during an interview, according to the May 31, 2006, edition of the Cleveland Plain Dealer. According to Blaesing's son, his mother was not interested in seeking DNA evidence confirming paternity. Some scholars argued that the Blaesings had a "moral and civic responsibility" to provide their DNA for comparative purposes.

DNA confirmation

In 2015, The New York Times reported that genetic testing by AncestryDNA, a division of Ancestry.com, confirmed that Harding was Blaesing's biological father.

References

Sources

Associated Press Wire Service.  Secret Kept for Twenty Years: California Woman Says She is Daughter of Harding. Tri-City Herald, Pasco, Washington, p. 15, July 17, 1964.
Dean, John; Schlesinger, Arthur M. Warren Harding (The American President Series), Times Books, 2004. 

Mee, Charles Jr. The Ohio Gang: The World of Warren G. Harding: A Historical Entertainment M. Evans & Company, 1983. 
Presidential mystery stays unsolved. Sloat, Bill. The Plain Dealer, Cleveland, Ohio, May 31, 2006.
History's DNA. Appel, Jacob M.  The Chicago Tribune.  August 21, 2008.

External links

 

1919 births
2005 deaths
20th-century American women
21st-century American women
Warren G. Harding
People from Asbury Park, New Jersey
People from Glendale, California
Children of presidents of the United States
Harding family